Neopotamia is a genus of moths belonging to the subfamily Olethreutinae of the family Tortricidae.

Species
Neopotamia angulata Kawabe, 1995
Neopotamia armatana Kuznetzov, 1988
Neopotamia atrigrapta Razowski, 2009
Neopotamia calogona Diakonoff, 1973
Neopotamia cathemacta Diakonoff, 1983
Neopotamia cryptocosma Diakonoff, 1973
Neopotamia divisa (Walsingham, 1900)
Neopotamia formosa Kawabe, 1989
Neopotamia ioxantha (Meyrick, 1907)
Neopotamia leucotoma Diakonoff, 1973
Neopotamia ochracea (Walsingham, 1900)
Neopotamia orophias (Meyrick, 1907)
Neopotamia punctata Kawabe, 1989
Neopotamia rubra Kawabe, 1992
Neopotamia siamensis Kawabe, 1995
Neopotamia streblopa (Meyrick, 1936)
Neopotamia tornocroca Diakonoff, 1973
Neopotamia triloba Razowski, 2009

See also
List of Tortricidae genera

References

External links
tortricidae.com

Olethreutini
Tortricidae genera
Taxa named by Alexey Diakonoff
Tortricidae